The 1981–82 Syracuse Orangemen basketball team represented Syracuse University during the 1981–82 NCAA men's basketball season.

Roster
G Tony Bruin
F/C Andre Hawkins
F Sean Kerins
F Chris Lewis
F Ron Payton
G Calvin Perry
F Leo Rautins
F Erich Santifer
G Sonny Spera
C. Timberlake
F Gene Waldron
Greg Watson
F/C Peter Wynne

References

Syracuse Orange men's basketball seasons
Syracuse
Syracuse Orange
Syracuse Orange